Roberta Lynn Gilchrist, FSA, FBA (born 28 June 1965) is a Canadian-born archaeologist and academic specialising in the medieval period, whose career has been spent in the United Kingdom. She is Professor of Archaeology and Dean of Research at the University of Reading.

Early life and education
Gilchrist was born on 28 June 1965 in Canada. She moved to the UK in 1982 to study archaeology at the University of York. She graduated with a Bachelor of Arts (BA) degree in 1986 and a Doctor of Philosophy (DPhil) degree in 1990. Her doctoral thesis was titled "The archaeology of female piety: gender, ideology and material culture in later medieval England (c. 1050–1550)".

Academic career
Gilchrist began her academic career in 1990, when she became a lecturer at University of East Anglia. In 1996, she moved to the University of Reading to take up the position of Professor of Archaeology. She was previously the Head of School of Archaeology, Geography and Environmental Science. Since 2015, she has been Dean of Research for Heritage and Creativity.

In addition to her university work, she has held a number of positions. From 1993 to 2005, she was the consultant archaeologist to Norwich Cathedral. From 1997 to 2006, she was Editor of World Archaeology, an academic journal specialising in all aspects of archaeology. She served as president of the Society for Medieval Archaeology from 2004 to 2007.

She specialises in the archaeology of the medieval period in the UK, especially in relation to the archaeology of religion, and the archaeology of gender.

Honours
In 2002, Gilchrist was elected a Fellow of the Society of Antiquaries of London (FSA). In 2008, she was elected a Fellow of the British Academy (FBA). Also in 2008, she won the Society for Medieval Archaeology's Martyn Jope Award for "the best novel interpretation, application of analytical method or presentation of new findings" published in that year's volume of Medieval Archaeology.

In February 2016, Gilchrist won the "Archaeologist of the Year" award in the Current Archaeology Awards, which are voted for by the public, and recognise people who have made outstanding contributions to archaeology. In 2018 she was elected as a Honorary Fellow of Jesus College, Cambridge.

Books
(Edited with H. Mytum) The Archaeology of Rural Monasteries. Oxford: British Archaeological Reports (BAR 203), 1989
(With M. Oliva) Religious women in medieval East Anglia. Norwich: Centre of East Anglian Studies, 1993
(Edited with H. Mytum) Advances in monastic archaeology: Conference on urban monasteries. Oxford: Tempus Reperatum, 1993 
Gender and Material Culture: the archaeology of religious women. London: Routledge, 1994
Contemplation and Action: the other monasticism. Leicester: Leicester University Press, 1995 
Gender and Archaeology: Contesting the Past. London: Routledge, 1999
(Edited with D. Gaimster) The archaeology of Reformation. London: Maneys, 2003  
(With B. Sloane) Requiem: the Medieval Monastic Cemetery in Britain. London: Museum of London Archaeological Service, 2005
Norwich Cathedral Close: the Evolution of the English Cathedral Landscape. Woodbridge: Boydell and Brewer, 2005
Medieval Life: Archaeology and the Life Course. Woodbridge: Boydell and Brewer, 2012
(With C. Green) Glastonbury Abbey: archaeological investigations 1904-79, 2015 
Sacred Heritage: Monastic Archaeology, Identities, Beliefs, Cambridge University Press, 2020,

References

External links

Profile page at Reading University

Canadian archaeologists
Canadian women archaeologists
Alumni of the University of York
Academics of the University of Reading
Academics of the University of East Anglia
Fellows of the Society of Antiquaries of London
1965 births
Living people
20th-century Canadian women scientists
Fellows of the British Academy
British women historians
21st-century Canadian women scientists
Medieval archaeologists